, known for sponsorship reasons as Mitsubishi Heavy Industries Urawa Reds Ladies, is a women's football club playing in Japan's football league, WE League. Its hometown is the city of Saitama in Saitama Prefecture.

Kits

Kit suppliers and shirt sponsors

Other teams
Men's: Urawa Red Diamonds plays in J1 League.
Youth: Urawa Red Diamonds Ladies Youth (Under-18) plays in Kantō League.
Junior Youth: Urawa Red Diamonds Ladies Junior Youth (Under-14) plays in Saitama League.

Player

Current squad

Notable players
GK
 Nozomi Yamago (2005–2012)
DF
 Kyoko Yano (2007–2012)
 Saki Kumagai (2009–2011)

Club officials

Honours

Domestic
WE League
Runners-up (1): 2021–22Nadeshiko League Division 1Champions (4): 2004, 2009, 2014, 2020Runners-up (3): 2006, 2010, 2019Empress's CupChampions (1): 2021Runners-up (5): 2004, 2009, 2010, 2014, 2019, 2020WE League CupChampions (1): 2022–23
Nadeshiko League Cup
Runners-up (3): 2007, 2010, 2017
Nadeshiko Super Cup
Runners-up (1): 2005

International
Japan/Korea Women's League Championship
Champions (1): 2010

Season-by-season records

Transition of team name
Urawa Reinas FC: 1999–2001
Saitama  Reinas FC: 2002–2004
Urawa Red Diamonds Ladies: 2005–present

See also
Japan Football Association (JFA)
2022–23 in Japanese football
List of women's football clubs in Japan

References

External links
 Official website

Ladies
Women's football clubs in Japan
1998 establishments in Japan
Mitsubishi Motors
Japan Women's Football League teams
Sports teams in Saitama (city)
WE League clubs